Alan Moffat (born May 7, 1952) is a Canadian football player who played professionally for the Hamilton Tiger-Cats.

References

1952 births
Hamilton Tiger-Cats players
Living people